Haraka may mean:

 A type of Arabic diacritics
 Haraka (software), an email server software
 Haraka (hash function), a cryptographic hash function